Abbasid invasion of Asia Minor may refer to:

Abbasid invasion of Asia Minor (782)
Abbasid invasion of Asia Minor (806)
Abbasid invasion of Asia Minor (862)